Lenny Bruce: Swear to Tell the Truth is a 1998 documentary film directed by Robert B. Weide about the comedian Lenny Bruce.

Accolades
It was nominated for an Academy Award for Best Documentary Feature. The film was edited by Mr. Weide and Geof Bartz, A.C.E. who won a Primetime Emmy Award for their work on this film.

Summary
The film was narrated by Robert De Niro. It featured interviews include Lenny's ex-wife Honey, mother Sally Marr and former TV host Steve Allen, who had Bruce on his show a few times albeit clean unlike his nightclub stand-up jokes.

See also
 Robert De Niro filmography
Lenny-the 1974 Oscar-nominated fictional docudrama by Bob Fosse
Richard Pryor
George Carlin
Chris Rock

References

External links
Lenny Bruce: Swear To Tell The Truth at Whyaduck Productions

Paley Center article

1998 films
American documentary films
American black-and-white films
Films directed by Robert B. Weide
Documentary films about comedy and comedians
Lenny Bruce
Films about censorship
Primetime Emmy Award-winning broadcasts
1990s English-language films
1990s American films